Street Charge is a solar-powered phone charging station developed by NRG Energy, Inc., designed to grant free phone charging services to pedestrians and tourists. The charging stations can also be modified to emit Wi-Fi signals and display advertisements. The appliance was released in 2013, and the original prototype was tested in Brooklyn, New York.

Implementation and controversy

There is currently a collaboration between NRG Energy, Inc. and AT&T to implement Street Charge units throughout New York City, which will each offer six USB ports in total. This project will cost around $300,000-500,000. As of 2013 there was a controversy surrounding Street Charge appliances in that there were no plans implemented to protect appliances and users utilizing the device. The concern was that the wiring might be modified by malicious users to steal or wipe data from devices plugged into the device.

References

Mobile phone culture
NRG Energy
Solar energy in the United States
Communications in New York City
2013 introductions